George Galloway (born 1954) is a British politician.

George Galloway may also refer to:
George Galloway (cricketer) (1803–1867), English cricketer
George Galloway (parachute maker) (born 1949), American parachute manufacturer
George N. Galloway (1841/42–1904), American soldier and Medal of Honor recipient